William Henry "Harry" Wahl (December 14, 1902 – April 1, 1975) was a farm implement dealer and political figure in Saskatchewan. He represented Qu'Appelle-Wolseley from 1952 to 1956 in the Legislative Assembly of Saskatchewan as a Co-operative Commonwealth Federation (CCF) member.

He was born in Carnduff, Saskatchewan, the son of Jacob Wahl and Isabell Newcomb, both of United Empire Loyalist descent. In 1936, he married Ruth McDonald. Wahl lived in Glenavon, Saskatchewan. He served as mayor of Glenavon, as a member of the local school board and as a member of the Saskatchewan Wheat Pool. Wahl was defeated by Douglas Thomas McFarlane when he ran for reelection to the provincial assembly in 1956 and again in 1960.

References 

Saskatchewan Co-operative Commonwealth Federation MLAs
20th-century Canadian politicians
1902 births
1975 deaths
Mayors of places in Saskatchewan
People from Carnduff